Tamu Tamu: Kenyan Cuisine with a Twist is a Kenyan cooking show starring Ali Mandhry, better known as chef Ali L'artiste.

Tamu Tamu is one of the first cooking shows in Kenya that was filmed in an outdoor kitchen setup showcasing authentic Kenyan cuisines. The show aired on NTV (Kenya) and was hosted by Kenya's Celebrity Chef Ali Mandhry.

Tamu Tamu is the first Kenyan cookery show on an outdoor setup showcasing the beautiful cultures.

Cooking television series
Kenyan television series
2013 Kenyan television series debuts
2010s Kenyan television series
NTV (Kenyan TV channel) original programming